Aero Asia International  (commonly known as AeroAsia) was the principle and one of the largest private international airline based in Karachi, Pakistan from 1993 until its collapse on 19 May 2007.

Founded in 1993 by Tabani Group of Investors,  Aero Asia started its operations as a scheduled passenger and cargo air service to its domestic and international destinations in Gulf states.  Aero Asia was noted as a Low-cost carrier with wide usage of jet aircraft and jumbo jets. In 2006,  Aero Asia was acquired by the British Regal Group from the Tabani Investors but soon failed to provide safety guidelines to its customers.

The managerial, corporate management issues, and financial problems caused to Aero Asia led to its suspension by the Civil Aviation Authority (CAA) on 10 May 2007. Its previous management's issues relating to the operating compliance on CAA terms and its customer's safety guidelines failed to respond to repeated warnings over a lengthy period. Despite speculations on resuming its operations, the Aero Asia's corporate office's spokesperson confirmed its financial collapse.

History

Aero Asia International (Pvt) Ltd. was established and founded by the Tabani Group of Companies in 1993 who benefited with the privatization program in 1993. Aero Asia started its aerial operations on 4 May 1993. The Aero Asia made a promising start after employing former managerial and corporate staff of Pakistan International Airlines, and hired a flurry of former pilots of the PAF and the Navy. On immediate basis, the Aero Asia's corporate contracted two Romanian Airlines aircraft for wet-lease and lease-purchase of the BAC 1-11. Operations were started with a wet-leased BAC 1-11 from the VIP fleet of Romania operated by Romanian Airlines, a sister company of the Romanian Air Force.

This fleet was primarily used by Romanian government dignitaries during Nicolae Ceaușescu's times. However, the post Ceaușescu governments decided to earn a little money by leasing this fleet to other commercial operators. Later, Aero Asia obtained four BAC 1-11s on lease purchase option from TAROM, the national airline of Romania.

The airline in its initial years, made serious commitments to training its locally hired staff, following the example of PIA and in line with requirements of the local civil aviation authority. A small training school was also founded to train members of the cabin crew. Former Pakistan Air Force pilots were recruited. They began flying as co-pilots with the Romanian Pilots.

In 1994, Aero Asia took the usual step for a private airline in Pakistan by recruitment of ex - Airmen from Pakistan Air Force and a batch of trainees for aircraft maintenance, announcing that a fully functional aircraft maintenance facility was planned. Senior retired staff from the PIA training center were employed and approval of the training school from the local civil aviation authority was sought.

Aero Asia started its international operation on a route to Bishkek, in Central Asia. For this purpose another aircraft from the VIP fleet of Romania, a Boeing 707 was leased. The move to shift international operations to central Asian ex-USSR states was supposed to help the
other businesses of Tabani Group in penetrating the countries. Later, Aero Asia started flying to the Gulf Emirate of Sharjah, linking to Dubai via road network. It also established a small maintenance facility in Sharjah Airport Free Zone by taking over a small aircraft hangar and offering services to third parties.

Aero Asia operated a fleet of three to five Yakovlev Yak-42D on main trunk routes in Pakistan. These were mainly Karachi, Islamabad and Lahore. However, as demand rose through the years, the airline replaced its YAK-42Ds with Boeing 737-200Adv and Douglas DC-9s. The airline also introduced a more modern livery instead of having the colours of a past operator of the aircraft on its fuselage. A large "Aero Asia" was added to the front fuselage in bold red colour with the airline logo in between the words and on the tail. 

At the start of 2006, Aero Asia and Askari Bank MasterCard announced their strategic alliance to offer their card members special discounts.

In May 2007, the CAA of Pakistan suspended the operations of Aero Asia due to issues related to the safety of operations and passenger convenience. The airline announced that it had decided to suspend operations temporarily with effect from 19 May 2007 until further notice.

The carrier was recently acquired by a prominent group from Dubai.

Destinations
Aero Asia International served the following, some routes were ended much before closure:

Fleet

The company returned  the aircraft being operated on 19 May 2007 under wet lease arrangements to the lessors and was negotiating to acquire a fleet of five 737-300 aircraft under funding arrangements concordant with the 2007 Draft National Aviation Policy for Pakistan.

Over the years Aero Asia operated these aircraft:

7 BAC One-Eleven Series 500
1 Boeing 707-320C
5 Boeing 737-200
2 McDonnell Douglas DC-9-51 (Leased from Khors Air)
3 McDonnell Douglas MD-82
2 McDonnell Douglas MD-83
3 Yakovlev Yak-42

See also
List of defunct airlines of Pakistan

References

External links

Defunct airlines of Pakistan
Airlines established in 1993
Airlines disestablished in 2007
Defunct low-cost airlines
Pakistani companies established in 1993
Pakistani companies disestablished in 2007